Fernão Lopes de Castanheda (Santarém, c. 1500 – 1559 in Coimbra) was a Portuguese historian in the early Renaissance.
His "History of the discovery and conquest of India", full of geographic and ethnographic objective information, was widely translated throughout Europe.

Life 
Castanheda was the natural son of a royal officer, who held the post of judge in Goa. In 1528, he accompanied his father to Portuguese India and to the Moluccas. There he remained ten years, from 1528 to 1538, during which he gathered as much information as he could about the discovery and conquest of India by the Portuguese, in order to write a book on the subject. In 1538, he returned to Portugal, having collected from written and oral sources material for his great historical work. In serious economic difficulties, he settled in Coimbra, where he held a modest post of bedel in the University of Coimbra.

Works 
Eight of the ten books of Castanheda's "História do descobrimento e conquista da Índia pelos portugueses" (History of the discovery and conquest of India by the Portuguese) were printed in Coimbra: the first volume was issued in 1551, with a second edition in 1554. Six more volumes were published in his lifetime and three posthumously. 
After the eighth volume was issued, regent Queen D. Catarina, pressured by few noblemen who disliked the objectivity of Castanheda, banned the printing of the remaining ninth and tenth volumes. His work, full of geographic and ethnographic information, was soon widely translated throughout Europe, first into French by Nicolas de Grouchy, a teacher at the University, Spanish (1554), Italian (1578) and English (1582).

References

External links
 
The first booké of the historie of the discouerie and conquest of the East Indias, enterprised by the Portingales, Book I, 1582 (full text in English).
História do descobrimento e conquista da Índia pelos portugueses, Book I (full text in Portuguese).
História do descobrimento e conquista da Índia pelos portugueses, Book III (full text in Portuguese).
História do descobrimento e conquista da Índia pelos portugueses, Book IV-V (full text in Portuguese).
História do descobrimento e conquista da Índia pelos portugueses, Book VIII (full text in Portuguese).
Fernão Lopes de Castanheda biography (in Portuguese).
História do descobrimento e conquista da Índia pelos portugueses - Books I-VIII, first edition (Biblioteca Nacional de Portugal; full text in Portuguese)

1500s births
1559 deaths
Portuguese exploration in the Age of Discovery
16th-century Portuguese historians
Portuguese chroniclers
Portuguese travel writers
Portuguese Renaissance writers
University of Coimbra alumni
Portuguese India
Maritime history of Portugal
People from Santarém, Portugal